Antonina Lucinschi, russified as Antonina Georgievna Luchinskaya (13 

September 1939 – 16 September 2005) was a retired Moldovan schoolteacher who was the wife of Petru Lucinschi, the 2nd President of Moldova. As a result of her marriage, she was the First Lady of Moldova from 15 January 1997 – 7 April 2001.

She was born in 1939 in the Soviet Union into a family of Russian origin. She married her husband in January 1965 just after he was discharged from the Soviet Army. They first met at a concert inside the Bolshoi Theatre. Soon thereafter, they gave birth to their first son. In the mid-late 70s, she studied at the Ion Creangă Pedagogical State University and the Moscow State Pedagogical University.

During the presidency of her husband, Lucinschi took part in the foundation of charitable organizations such as Brindusele Sperantei, the Forum of Women's Organizations of Moldova, and the Philanthropist club of classical music lovers. The Association Against Domestic Violence "Casa Mărioarei" was an independent association founded in 2000 at the initiative of Lucinschi to support survivors of domestic violence.

Lucinschi died in 2005 after an illness and was buried in the Central Armenian Cemetery of Chisinau. Besides her husband, she is survived by her two sons Sergey and Kirill. Today, a national contest of musicians is held in her name annually.

References

Links
 АНТОНИНА ЛУЧИНСКАЯ: ЭХО ДРУГ ДРУГА 1.m2p

1939 births
2005 deaths
First ladies and gentlemen of Moldova
Moldovan women in politics